Saiakopli is a village in Tapa Parish, Lääne-Viru County, in northeastern Estonia. Saiakopli is bordered by the Tallinn–Tapa–Tartu railway to the southwest and by the Valgejõgi River to the northwest.

References

 

Villages in Lääne-Viru County
Kreis Jerwen